Jazz Mood is the first released album by multi-instrumentalist Yusef Lateef recorded in 1957 and released on the Savoy label. The album was produced from Lateef's second recording session.

Reception

The Allmusic site awarded the album 4½ stars.

Track listing 
All compositions by Yusef Lateef
 "Metaphor" – 8:09
 "Yusef's Mood" – 8:36
 "The Beginning" – 4:13
 "Morning" – 10:38
 "Blues in Space" – 7:07

Personnel 
 Yusef Lateef – tenor saxophone, flute, track 1 – argol, intro track 1 – scraper
 Curtis Fuller – trombone, tambourine
 Hugh Lawson – piano
 Ernie Farrow – bass, rabat
 Louis Hayes – drums
 Doug Watkins – finger cymbals, percussion

References 

Yusef Lateef albums
1957 albums
Albums produced by Ozzie Cadena
Savoy Records albums